Footvolley (  in Brazil, Futevólei  in Portugal) is a sport that combines aspects of beach volleyball and association football.

Footvolley was created by Octavio de Moraes in 1965 in Brazil. Footvolley combines field rules that are based on those of beach volleyball with ball-touch rules taken from association football. Essentially footvolley is beach volleyball except players are not allowed to use their hands and a football replaces the volleyball.

History
Footvolley was created by Octavio de Moraes in 1965 in Rio de Janeiro's Copacabana Beach. The game of footvolley was first called 'pevoley', literally meaning "footvolley", but that name was discarded in favor of "futevôlei". (Cf. Portuguese futebol, "association football".) Footvolley started in Rio de Janeiro, according to one player because football was banned on the beach, but volleyball courts were open. The sport had spread to Recife, Salvador, Brasília, Goiânia, Santos, and Florianópolis by the 1970s.

Teams of footvolley had five aside at first. Due to the skill level of the footvolley athletes (nearly all were professional football players), the ball would rarely drop. The players began lowering the number of players on each side, eventually settling on 2 versus 2, which is still in use today.

In recent years, professional football players have taken up footvolley in both promotional events and celebrity matches. Some notable Brazilian footballers who have played (or still play) footvolley are Romário, Edmundo, Ronaldo, Ronaldinho Gaúcho, Júnior, and Edinho (1982 & 1986 National Team).

The first International Footvolley event to occur outside of Brazil was in 2003 by the United States Footvolley Association on Miami Beach at the 2003 Fitness Festival. This event led to international players and teams in pursuit of federation status. A tournament was held during the 2016 Summer Olympics in Rio, as a demonstration sport.

The Footvolleyball 
An indoor footvolleyball looks like a basketball, but at only 360g, it is smaller in diameter, bouncier, and heavier than a volleyball.

Rules
Footvolley combines field rules that are based on those of beach volleyball with ball-touch rules taken from association football. Essentially footvolley is beach volleyball except players are not allowed to use their hands and a football replaces the volleyball.

International rules
Points are awarded if the ball hits the ground in the opponent's court, if the opponents commit a fault, or if they fail to return the ball over the net. Scoring is done using the rally point system (new volleyball rules). Match scoring is usually up to the event organizer's discretion. Generally speaking, matches are one set to 18 points; or best of three sets to 15 points (with the third set to 11 points). The court is 29.5 feet x 59 ft (old beach volleyball). The height of the net varies based on the competition.

International growth

Since the sport's inception in Brazil, footvolley has spread and gained popularity internationally, including in the Americas, Europe, Africa, the Middle East, Asia, and Oceania.

Major events have been held at many beach cities in countries around the world, including Spain, Portugal, Israel, Greece, United Arab Emirates, France, the Netherlands, Aruba, Thailand, South Africa, Paraguay, Brazil, Argentina, and Iran.

Paraguay
Paraguay was the first world champion of footvolley. The Paraguayan Jesús is considered the best player in the World Championship.

Brazil
Brasília (the capital of Brazil) has produced players like Eduardo Papel, Gabriel, Xeleleu, Jansen de Oliveira, Ramiro, Betola, Edinho, Hugão, and Luisinho who are till today in activity and besides their admired carriers, they also taught other popular young players, including Belo, Marcelinho, Mário, Café, Diego and Lana (in female and unisex footvolley).

United Kingdom
In April 1997, the England Team accompanied football legends John Barnes and Niall Quinn to a tournament in Pattaya, Thailand organized by the Thai Footvolley Federation.

In 2007 the two events held were the Muller Rice cake Open in Croyde, and the Lamisil Once Footvolley Open in Brighton. Dirceu and Luigi were champions at both events, maintaining their unbeaten record and David and Gary, the England Footvolley Team No. 1 pair won the Shield Competition.

Israel

Footvolley was first played in Israel in 2003 when a few beach boys from Gordon Beach, Tel Aviv learned about the exciting game from two Brazilian soccer players who played for Israeli teams. It was in 2007 that Corona in Israel got involved in footvolley, establishing the first footvolley ordinary league already in 2008.

Corona FootVolley League, so far the only ordinary footvolley league in the world, is played since 2008 every summer starting in May/June until the final four in September/October with 12 teams and 11 league rounds in the Premier league and 12 teams playing 11 rounds in the Masters league.

In 2009 Corona FootVolley European Tour was established by inviting teams from Europe to play in Israel. In 2011 Corona FootVolley European Tour was upgraded to Corona FootVolley World Tour inviting teams from all over the world to play.

Corona FootVolley Winter Cup, a two-day tournament, is also played in Israel every February since 2010.
Since 2016 the IFA (Israel footvolley association) started to arrange footvolley all over the country, including "Israel footvolley league" and the local ranking event under the partnership with the European footvolley league "EFVL"

Italy
The first Footvolley Italia Tour was in 2008 when a group of friends from Ravenna organized the event. Normally the tour is in the months of June, July and August and the tournaments that compose the tour are 4-5 a year. In Italy are used the international rules:court 9mx9m and the net 2,20m.

Australia
Footvolley Australia (FVA) is the first peak body responsible for footvolley in Australia. FVA was founded in 2007 in the Northern Beaches of Sydney, Australia. The organisation was formed to establish, guide and promote footvolley in Australia. The FVA are working on the development of the practice of footvolley by organising Footvolley Experience sessions for newcomers to the sport; footvolley education and coaching across Australia; the National Footvolley Tour; and participation in international competitions. Footvolley Australia is working with relevant international associations, especially in the Asia and Oceania regions, to promote the growth of the game.

United States
In the United States, footvolley began in South Florida. Local promoters organized the 2002 Impulse Energy drink South Beach Footvolley Tournament which was won by Adrian Boente. In 2005, the United States Footvolley Association was created in Miami Beach. Every year since 2005 a National Championship has been held. The first National Championship was held on December 11, 2005. The winning side was Franco Cappuotti (Hollywood, FL) and Claudio Rodriguez (Orlando, FL). Runners-up were Adriano Boente and Alberto 'Betto' Lima. In December 2006, the second National Championship took place which was won by Brenno Souza (Miami, FL) with Paulo Ricardo (Deerfield Beach, FL). The 3rd National Championships, occurred in September 2007, on Hollywood Beach. This time Adriano Boente (Deerfield Beach, FL) and Junior Pereira (Boca Raton, FL) were crowned National Champions. The 4th US Footvolley National Championships occurred in August 2008, once again, on Miami Beach with Miguel Habib and Eduardo Fiuza beating Adrian Boente and Junior Pereira in the final. The 2009 National Championships were held on Miami Beach in December. The winners were Adrian Boente and Felipe Tolomelli (Deerfield Beach, FL) who beat Renato Teixeira (Coconut Creek, FL) and Ricardo Cardoso (Boca Raton, FL). In 2010, the National Champions were Sergio Menezes (Miami Beach, FL) and Igor Martins (Doral, FL) who beat Lucas Roque (Deerfield Beach, FL) and Karl Meneghisso (Riviera Beach, FL). For the 2011 and 2012 National Championships, points taken from the Pro Footvolley Tour circuit were used to determine the winners. In both, 2011 and 2012, Lucas Roque and Karl Meneghisso were considered National Champions for finishing the Tour with the highest point totals. In 2013, the National Championship was determined from the Hollywood Beach Open. The winners were Fernando Plentz (Miami, FL) and Adriano Boente (Deerfield Beach, FL). The 2014 US Footvolley National Championships were held in December, on Miami Beach. The winners for 2014 were Sergio Menezes and Wellington Oliveira winning on Miami Beach, FL. The 2015 US Footvolley National Championships were held in October 2015, on Miami Beach. The winners were Oscar Calvancanti (Miami, FL) with Carlos Valadares (Boca Raton, FL). In 2016, the US Footvolley National Championships were held in December, on Miami Beach, with the winning side of Antonio DiMasio (Miami Beach, FL) and Alberto Lima (Miami, FL) beating Sergio Menezes (Miami Beach, FL) and Oscar Calvacante (Miami Beach, FL). The 2017 US Footvolley National Championships were held on December 3, 2017. Sergio Menezes and Leonardo Lasmar (Miami, FL) beat Bruno Baiao (Surfside, FL) and Candido de Souza (Kendell, FL). The 2018 US Footvolley National Championships were held on September 9th and 10th, 2018 on Pompano Beach, FL. Karl Meneghisso and Wellington Corea beat Fernando Plentz & William Lobato to win the Title. With the Pro Footvolley Tour, up and running again in 2019, the National Champions were determined from a series of 3 events held on Hollywood Beach, FL. Once again, Luke 'The Rock' Roque and Karl Meneghisso were superior to the rest of all US-based athletes in winning all three stages and becoming the 2019 National Champions.

2016 Olympic Qualifiers
In 2016, the United States Footvolley Association, held Olympic qualifiers which consisted of local and then a final national tournament. The initial tournaments were held in South Florida (Sunny Isles Beach, FL) and in Southern California (Huntington Beach, CA). US Footvolley covered the costs for the winning teams to travel to Seaside, Oregon for the final tournament to determine the nation's #1 American team. Sergio Menezes and Lucas Roque (the South Florida winners) faced Akad Kader and Alex Freire (both of Los Angeles, CA) in the final in Seaside, OR. Menezes and Roque won the match and were given the chance to represent the United States at the 2016 Rio Footvolley Exhibition Tournament. On the women's side, Melony Poviones and Leah Morales produced the most points from a round-robin tournament to become the women's representatives for the event.

2016 Rio Tournament
At the 2016 RIO World Footvolley Tournament, Menezes/Roque lost to Germany in the Quarter-Finals in a tight match. On the women's side, Team USA Poviones/Morales beat Italy in the Quarter-finals. The women lost to Holland in the Semi-finals. The team placed 4th after losing to Brazil in the Consolation Match.

Pro Footvolley Tour
The Pro Footvolley Tour is America's professional touring series, established in March 2008. The Tour began regionally and expanded nationally in 2011. In 2011 and 2012, the Tour was sponsored by Bud Light Lime. In 2013, Pro Footvolley Tour switched sponsorship to Coors Light. Events have been held in Santa Barbara; Virginia Beach, VA; Seaside Heights, NJ; Pompano Beach, FL; Hollywood Beach, FL; Miami Beach, FL; Lauderdale-by-the-Sea, FL; Daytona Beach, FL; and Panama City, FL. The Tour is the world's number one distributor of professional footvolley content to major broadcast networks around the World. The Tour has aired over 300 hours of professional footvolley since 2013. The Tour counts ESPN, BeinSports, Spectrum Sports, Root Sports, AT&T Sports, WAPA Deportes, and Eleven Sports as broadcast partners.

Footvolley Equipment
In 2015, Pro Footvolley Tour launched the World's first footvolley purpose ball. US Footvolley used this ball during the 2016 US Olympic Qualifiers. To date, this footvolley-only specific ball continues to be in use on the Pro Footvolley Tour.

South Korea 
The game is featured in 2018 Idol Star Athletics Bowling Archery Rhythmic Gymnastics Foot Volleyball Championships during Chuseok, the rules are 4 on 4, from a team of six, the third set is still at 15 points. The rules allow one bounce, unless if it touches the boundary lines or the net.

See also
Sepak takraw

References

Association football variants
Volleyball variations
Sports originating in Brazil
Beach sports
Hybrid sports 
 Articles containing video clips